Boima Cummins (born April 5, 2003) is an American soccer player who plays as a midfielder for New York Red Bulls II in the USL Championship via the New York Red Bulls Academy.

Career
Cummins played as a member of Minnesota United's academy before moving to New York Red Bulls. It was announced that Cummins would play college soccer at Wake Forest University in 2021.

During the 2020 USL Championship season Cummins appeared for New York Red Bulls II. He made his debut as a 83rd-minute substitute during a 5-1 win over Philadelphia Union II on July 22, 2020.

References

External links 
 
 ussoccerda.com profile

2003 births
Living people
American soccer players
Association football midfielders
New York Red Bulls II players
Soccer players from Michigan
USL Championship players